Christophorus Henricus Diedericus Buys Ballot (October 10, 1817 – February 3, 1890) was a Dutch chemist and meteorologist after whom Buys Ballot's law and the Buys Ballot table are named. He was first chairman of the International Meteorological Organization, the organization that would become the World Meteorological Organization.

Biography

Buys Ballot was the son of a Dutch Reformed minister, born in Kloetinge, Netherlands. He attended the Gymnasium at Zaltbommel and the University of Utrecht. After receiving his doctorate in 1844, he became lecturer in mineralogy and geology at Utrecht; he added theoretical chemistry in 1846. In 1847 he was appointed professor of mathematics and from 1867 until his retirement he was professor of physics.

Buys Ballot tested the Doppler effect for sound waves in 1845 by using a group of musicians playing a calibrated note on a train in the Utrecht-Amsterdam line.

He died in the Dutch city of Utrecht.

Accomplishments

Buys Ballot is best known for his accomplishments in the field of meteorology, specifically the explanation of the direction of air flow in large weather systems. Furthermore, he founded the Royal Dutch Meteorological Institute in 1854 and he remained its chief director until his death. He was one of the first to see the need for international cooperation, and in 1873 he organized and became the first chairman of the International Meteorological Organization, a precursor of the World Meteorological Organization (WMO).

Buys Ballot's law states that if a person in the Northern Hemisphere stands with his back to the wind, the atmospheric pressure is low to the left, high to the right. His main research effort in meteorology went into examining long-time series for regularities; he was more concerned with establishing the regularities than in explaining them. He made no contributions to the theory of meteorology which is perhaps surprising given his training in physics. The contrast with his American contemporary, William Ferrel, who discovered Buys-Ballot's law slightly earlier, is striking.

Buys Ballot devised a tabular method for investigating periodicity in time series. In 1847 he used the table now named after him to determine the period of the sun's rotation from daily observations of temperature in the Netherlands from 1729 to 1846.

Buys Ballot became member of the Royal Netherlands Academy of Arts and Sciences in 1855.

Among his students was the prominent Dutch astronomer Jacobus Kapteyn.

Eponym
In 1971 the lunar crater Buys-Ballot, on the far side of the Moon, was named in his honour.

Bibliography
Harold L. Burstyn "Buys Ballot, Christoph Hendrik Diederik" Dictionary of Scientific Biography  volume 1, p. 628, New York: Scribners 1973.
E. van Everdingen C. H. D. Buys Ballot 1817-1890 The Hague 1953.
O. B. Sheynin On the History of the Statistical Method in Meteorology, Archive for the History of the Exact Sciences, 31, (1984-5) 53-95.
J. L. Klein Statistical Visions in Time, Cambridge: Cambridge University Press 1997.

References

External links
M. Buys-Ballot, "Note sur le rapport de l'intensite et de la direction du vent avec les ecarts simultanes du barometre",  Comptes Rendus, Vol. 45 (1857), pp. 765–768.

19th-century Dutch chemists
Dutch meteorologists
19th-century Dutch physicists
1817 births
1890 deaths
Members of the Royal Netherlands Academy of Arts and Sciences
Corresponding members of the Saint Petersburg Academy of Sciences
Utrecht University alumni
Academic staff of Utrecht University
People from Goes
Scientists from Utrecht (city)